Chaetothyriomycetidae is a subclass of ascomycete within the class Eurotiomycetes.  Many species in Chaetothyriomycetidae are lichens.

Morphology
Chaetothyriomycetidae produce a cleistothecium through which they distribute their spores.

Gallery

References

External links

Chaetothyriomycetidae on Myconet

Eurotiomycetes
Fungus subclasses
Lichen subclasses